Colin Mark Weatherly (born 18 January 1958) is an English retired footballer. He spent his entire professional career with Gillingham, where he played in 457 Football League matches, a club record for an outfield player.

Career
Although born in Kent Weatherly was on the books of Coventry City as a schoolboy but was not retained. He also played for non-league Canterbury City from the age of 15. After his release from Coventry, he was signed by Gillingham as an apprentice and soon found himself making his first-team debut. At just 16 years 218 days he was at the time the youngest player ever to play for the club.

Originally a striker, he was switched to the defence in 1978 and played there or in midfield for the remainder of his career, which saw him play in over 500 matches in all competitions for the Kent club and win the club's Player of the Year award on two occasions. While at the Gills he was the subject of a children's book entitled Footballer (My Job).

In summer 1978 Weatherly moved to Finnish team called Koparit. He played there two months and became the first foreign player who had played in Kuopio. After him many English players move to Kuopio and played summers there. The teams they played were KuPS, Koparit and Kuopion Elo.

In 1989, he left Priestfield Stadium and dropped into non-league football. He joined Margate in 1991 and stayed there for ten years, including a spell as co-manager in the early 1990s during which he led the club to a Kent Senior Cup final victory at the ground of his old club Gillingham. He later had a spell managing Margate's local rivals Ramsgate.

In 2007, he returned to Margate as reserve team manager. In 2009, he became Head of Youth Development at Ramsgate.

References

1958 births
Living people
People from Ramsgate
English footballers
Canterbury City F.C. players
Gillingham F.C. players
Koparit players
Hythe Town F.C. players
Margate F.C. players
English Football League players
English football managers
Margate F.C. managers
Association football defenders
Association football forwards